The Hillsboro Banner is a weekly newspaper published in  Hillsboro, North Dakota in the United States.  The Banner  is the oldest weekly newspaper in the state of North Dakota.  It was first published in 1879 and became the official newspaper of Hillsboro in 1894.  The current circulation is around 1,150.

The Banner has repeatedly been recognized by the North Dakota Newspaper Association, and in 2021 was named "Best of the Dakotas" by the North and South Dakota Newspaper Associations among midsized weekly newspapers in the two states.

References

External links
Hillsboro Banner website

Newspapers published in North Dakota
Traill County, North Dakota